Sebastiania picardae is a species of flowering plant in the family Euphorbiaceae. It was described in 1902. It is native to Hispaniola.

References

picardae
Flora of Haiti
Flora of the Dominican Republic
Plants described in 1902
Flora without expected TNC conservation status